Brian Burgess (born 30 September 1957) is a Scottish former athlete who specialised in the high jump. His personal best jump of 2.20m, set in London on 11 June 1978, set a British national record.

A six-time Scottish champion, Burgess won a bronze medal for Scotland at the 1978 Commonwealth Games, with a best jump of 2.15m in the final, to share third place with Canada's Dean Bauck. He was the only non-Canadian on the podium and the first Scot to win a high jump medal since Alan Paterson in 1950.

Burgess was the British national champion for high jump in 1978, finishing third in the AAA Championships behind two Americans. He was a two-time champion at the UK Athletics Championships, in 1979 and 1981.

References

External links
Brian Burgess at World Athletics

1957 births
Living people
Scottish male high jumpers
British male high jumpers
Commonwealth Games medallists in athletics
Commonwealth Games bronze medallists for Scotland
Athletes (track and field) at the 1978 Commonwealth Games
Medallists at the 1978 Commonwealth Games